The rail network in Adelaide, South Australia, consists of four lines (six including two short spurs) and 89 stations, totalling . It is operated by Keolis Downer under contract from the Government of South Australia, and is part of the citywide Adelaide Metro public transport system.

All lines around Adelaide were originally  broad gauge.

Operators

Rail services around Adelaide are provided by a mixture of private and government-owned organisations.

The Department for Infrastructure & Transport (DIT) owns the suburban passenger rail network, comprising six lines originating from Adelaide railway station on North Terrace in the CBD. Since January 2021, operation of the network has been contracted to Keolis Downer.

The Australian Rail Track Corporation (ARTC), an agency of the Federal Government, owns standard gauge interstate lines heading north and south, together with the dual gauge freight-only branch from Dry Creek to Port Adelaide and Pelican Point. The ARTC lines bypass the city to the west and do not enter the CBD. The ARTC network extends from Adelaide towards Melbourne, Sydney, Perth and Darwin and is used by substantial interstate freight traffic.

Freight trains are operated by a number of private operators, which have access agreements with rail network owners such as the ARTC. The largest of these is Pacific National, which handles the majority of interstate traffic and has the largest locomotive fleet. Other logistics companies also operate freight trains to and from interstate destinations and within South Australia.

One Rail Australia owns the remaining broad-gauge lines beyond the Adelaide suburban network. These are a handful of lines used mainly to move bulk grain and stone from the Barossa Valley and mid-north region of the state to the Port Adelaide area.

Journey Beyond is a private company operating long-distance passenger trains on ARTCs standard gauge lines, and run from the Adelaide Parklands Terminal, just west of the CBD. Journey Beyond's trains are the Indian Pacific to Sydney and Perth, The Ghan to Alice Springs and Darwin, The Overland to Melbourne and the seasonal Great Southern to Brisbane. There have been no intrastate regional passenger services in South Australia since 1990.

There are presently two heritage railways in South Australia run by volunteers, but none of these are in the Adelaide area. SteamRanger is based at Mount Barker and runs services through to Victor Harbor. The Pichi Richi Railway is considerably more distant from Adelaide, based at Quorn, and runs services through to Port Augusta.

History

Early days
In 1856, the first steam train ran between Adelaide and Port Adelaide, stopping at Bowden, Woodville and Alberton. Soon after, a  line was built from the Gawler to Adelaide to cater for the agricultural and mining industries.

The South Line, through the Adelaide Hills, opened to Aldgate, then Nairne in 1883, and extended to Bordertown in 1886. The first through train between Adelaide and Melbourne – The Intercolonial Express – ran on 19 January 1887, and was the first intercapital rail journey in Australia without changing trains at a break-of-gauge station.

Most of the lines around Adelaide were built before 1900.

The Webb Era
Despite the earlier geographic expansion, by 1920 the infrastructure and rolling stock of South Australian Railways (SAR) had become run down, inadequate and outdated. Many of the operating practices, such as train control and signalling, were backward by the standards of the time.

However the 1920s saw substantial and expensive improvements in most facets of the SAR's operations under the leadership of Railways Commissioner William Webb. Webb was an American who had substantial operational experience with US railroads, and served as Commissioner between 1922 and 1930.

During his reign, track, bridges, railway workshops, rolling stock and especially steam locomotives were all modernised and upgraded along essentially American lines. Adelaide station was rebuilt with a handsome sandstone building as a showpiece of the city on North Terrace. The building still stands; the lower level remains as the railway station, but the upper levels have been converted into a casino.

In 1929, one of the original broad-gauge steam railways to the beach-side suburb of Glenelg was transferred to the Municipal Tramways Trust, electrified and converted to a tramway. The Glenelg tram line is still in operation.

SAR, STA and AN
From early colonial days up until 1978 the SAR had built and operated most of the railway system within the state.

The Commonwealth Railways (CR), owned by the Federal Government, also had a significant role in the northern part of SA, with lines from Port Augusta across the Nullarbor Plain to Kalgoorlie, and to Marree and Alice Springs. None of its lines came close to Adelaide.

During the early 1970s the Whitlam Federal Government proposed a strategy to nationalise and standardise the various state rail systems around Australia. South Australia and Tasmania were the only states to participate in this initiative and negotiations were long and drawn out. The result was that in March 1978 the SAR became defunct and South Australia's railways were split between Commonwealth and State Government ownership.

A new Commonwealth Government organisation, Australian National Railways Commission (ANR), took over all the former SAR and CR track in South Australia outside the metropolitan area. Other rail facilities such as property and workshops were also transferred to ANR. ANR become Australian National (AN) as it refined its corporate identity.

The State Government retained ownership and control of tracks and trains in the Adelaide suburban area under the auspices of the State Transport Authority (STA). The STA had been created in 1974 to co-ordinate all public transport in South Australia.

In 1994 the STA was abolished and reformed as the government-owned corporate body TransAdelaide as a prelude to competitive tendering for operation of bus and rail services in metropolitan Adelaide. TransAdelaide subsequently lost all its bus services to private operators, but has retained the contracts to operate train and tram services.

In November 1997, AN was broken up and sold as part of a Federal Government privatisation agenda. Track, workshops, depots and passenger and freight operations were sold to various private organisations, which has led to today's operational structure described in an earlier section.

Electrification projects

Seaford and Belair Line electrification 
In 2008, the South Australian government announced, in collaboration with the Federal government, a plan to upgrade and electrify the Seaford line and Belair line. Work on electrification of both of the lines began in January 2013. Works on the Belair line completed in mid-July 2013, and electric train services began in February 2014 on the Seaford Line.

Gawler Line electrification
Previously cancelled in 2013, electrification of the Gawler railway line was announced in 2018. Though Stage 1 electrification as far as Salisbury was initially planned, a $220 million grant from the Federal Government also allowed for Stage 2 electrification on the remainder of the line to proceed. Works commenced in November 2019, and after many delays electric train services began on 12 June 2022.

Future projects

Seaford Line extension to Aldinga Beach
In 2019, Renewal SA delivered a Draft Structure Plan of a 94 hectare area of land in Aldinga which is set to include a new school and a railway station as an extension of the Seaford railway line.

Underground city centre link
Infrastructure SA intends to complete electrification of the Gawler line, and analyse feasibility of an underground rail link in the CBD between the northern and southern railway lines.

Railway lines

Closed lines

Adelaide's passenger rail network has decreased in size since the 1950s, with the closure of several lines and branches, including:

Dry Creek–Port Adelaide line: built in 1868 (last passenger service in 1988; now freight only)
Finsbury line: Woodville to Finsbury Stores built in 1940 (closed in 1978)
Northfield line: Adelaide to Northfield built in 1857 (closed in 1987)
Penfield line: Salisbury to Penfield 3 built in 1941 (closed and dismantled in 1991)
Semaphore line: Port Adelaide to Semaphore built in 1878 (closed and dismantled in 1978)
Willunga line: Hallett Cove to Willunga built in 1915 (closed in 1969; now the Coast to Vines Rail Trail)

Rolling stock

See also
List of Adelaide railway stations
List of closed Adelaide railway stations
List of public transport routes in Adelaide
Trams in Adelaide
Transport in Adelaide

References and notes

External links
South Australia Central
Office of Public Transport
Adelaide Metro
National Railway Museum, Port Adelaide
SteamRanger
SA railway track and signalling

Regional rail in Australia
Rail transport in South Australia
5 ft 3 in gauge railways in Australia